Granotoma is a genus of sea snails, marine gastropod mollusks in the family Mangeliidae.

Species
Species within the genus Granotoma include:
 Granotoma albrechti (Krause, 1885)
 Granotoma dissoluta (Yokoyama, 1926)
 Granotoma kobelti (Verkrüzen, 1876)
 Granotoma krausei (Dall, 1887)
 Granotoma tumida (Posselt, 1898)
Species brought into synonymy
 Granotoma raduga (Bogdanov, I.P., 1985): synonym of Oenopota raduga Bogdanov, 1985

References

 Worldwide Mollusc Species Data Base: Mangeliidae

External links
 P Bartsch. "The Nomenclatorial Status of Certain Northern Turritid Mollusks"; Proceedings of the biological Society of Washington 54, 1-14, 1941
 Bouchet, P.; Kantor, Y. I.; Sysoev, A.; Puillandre, N. (2011). A new operational classification of the Conoidea. Journal of Molluscan Studies. 77, 273-308
  Tucker, J.K. 2004 Catalog of recent and fossil turrids (Mollusca: Gastropoda). Zootaxa 682:1-1295.

 
Gastropod genera